On November 6, 2012, the District of Columbia held a U.S. House of Representatives election for its shadow representative. Unlike its non-voting delegate, the shadow representative is only recognized by the district and is not officially sworn or seated. Incumbent Shadow Representative Mike Panetta declined to run for a fourth term. Nate Bennett-Fleming was elected in his place.

Primary elections
Primary elections were held on April 3, 2012.

Democratic primary

Candidates
 Nate Bennett-Fleming, Congressional fellow and candidate for Shadow Representative in 2010

Results

Other primaries
Republican and Statehood Green primaries were held but no candidates appeared on the ballot.

General election
The general election took place on November 6, 2012.

Results

References

Washington, D.C., Shadow Representative elections
2012 elections in Washington, D.C.